16 wit Dre, Vol. 2 is a 2006 remix album by deceased hyphy Bay Area rapper Mac Dre mixed by DJ Backside.

Track listing
"Dretro"
"Chedda Getta"
"Hongry"
"Gas You Up"
"California Bear"
"Legend"
"Many Styles"
"3rd Wall"
"Wild Night" (featuring Mob Figaz)
"Coonin"
"Thizzness"
"Hood Representatives"
"Murda"
"On"
"DJ Backside"
"Mr. Furly"

Mac Dre remix albums
2006 remix albums
Thizz Entertainment remix albums
Sequel albums
Remix albums published posthumously